The Canton Mint also romanised as Kwangtung Mint was a mint located in Guangdong, China which produced coinage at the discretion of the Canton Provincial government. Opened in 1889 it was the first mint in China that used modern minting techniques and was at the time the largest mint in the world producing 2.7 million coins per day.

History 

In 1887 as China began to modernise its minting methods British mint Heaton and Sons (later known as the Birmingham Mint) won a contract to build and equip a new mint in Canton Province. Designed in England the new Canton Mint constructed in Chinese style was opened by Viceroy Chang Chih-tung on 25 May 1889 at a total cost of 1 million dollars. Measuring 200 meters and 130 meters wide the Canton Mint was the largest mint in the world operating 90 minting presses as once, compared to the US mint's six.

In its opening year the mint produced the first Chinese Silver Dragon coins based on Japanese and Korean design.

The minted closed in 1931 and later briefly re-opened by the Kuomintang in 1949 before their retreat to Taiwan.

References 

Mints (currency)
Chinese numismatics